Lioptilodes fetisi is a species of moth in the genus Lioptilodes known from Chile. Moths of this species take flight in December and have a wingspan of approximately 21 millimetres. Lioptilodes fetisi is noted for its cream-white colour.

References

Platyptiliini
Moths described in 1991
Taxa named by Cees Gielis
Endemic fauna of Chile